Robert Viktorovich Merkulov (9 August 1931 – 6 November 2022) was a Russian speed skater who competed for the Soviet Union in the 1956 Winter Olympics. He was born in Moscow. In 1956 he finished fifth in the 1500 metres event.

Merkulov died on 6 November 2022, at the age of 91.

References

External links
Robert Merkulov's profile at Sports Reference.com
 

1931 births
2022 deaths
Soviet male speed skaters
Olympic speed skaters of the Soviet Union
Speed skaters at the 1956 Winter Olympics
Russian male speed skaters
World Allround Speed Skating Championships medalists
Speed skaters from Moscow
Honoured Masters of Sport of the USSR